The 1971–72 Hong Kong First Division League season was the 61st since its establishment.

League table

References
1971–72 Hong Kong First Division table (RSSSF)

Hong
Hong Kong First Division League seasons
football